Varendra, also known as Barind, was a region of North Bengal, now mostly in Bangladesh and a little portion in the Indian state of West Bengal.

It formed part of the Pundravardhana or Pundra Kingdom region currently part of Rangpur and Rajshahi Divisions of Bangladesh and included the districts of Bogra, Rajshahi, Pabna and Dinajpur of Bangladesh and West Dinajpur of India. According to Cunningham, the boundary of Varendra was the Ganges and the Mahananda on the west, the Karatoya on the east, the Padma River on the south and the land between Cooch Behar and the Terai on the north.

Literature and inscriptions
According to R. C. Majumdar, the term Varendra-mandala occurs in the Ramacharitam, which places it between the Ganges and Karatoya rivers. He writes, "Its inclusion with Pundravardhana is proved by the Silimpur, Tarpandighi and Madhainagar inscriptions. The Tabaquat-i-nasiri mentions Barind as the wing of the territory of Lakhnawati on the eastern side of Ganges".

History

Historical evidence attests significant presence of Brahmins in Bengal during the Maurya period. Such evidences suggest  or Vārendra and regions west of Bhagirathi (called Radha in ancient age) to be seats of Brahmins from ancient times;

According to HC Raychoudhuri the Gupta dyansty originated from the Varendri region. According to the Khalimpur copper plate inscription, the first Pala Emperor Gopala was the son of a warrior named Vapyata. The Ramacharitam attests that Varendra (North Bengal) was the fatherland (Janakabhu) of the Palas.

Ancient empires and rulers originated from Varendra region
Mauryan Empire
Gupta Empire
Pala Empire
Empire of Raja Ganesha
Kalapahad
Baro-Bhuyan (Bhati Rulers)
Diwan Mohanlal

Modern day prime ministers, president and chief ministers originated from Varendra region
Mohammad Ali Bogra
Ziaur Rahman
Hussein Muhammad Ershad
Khaleda Zia

Notable Varendra Brahmins
 Raja Ganesha, a Hindu ruler of Bengal
 Rani Bhabani, a Hindu zamindar of Natore
 Gautam Sanyal, Indian civil servant
 Surajit Chandra Lahiri, former Chief Justice of Calcutta High Court
 Nalinaksha Sanyal, Indian politician, economist and freedom fighter.
 Narayan Sanyal, writer of modern Bengali literature as well as a civil engineer.
 Pahari Sanyal, Indian actor and singer
 Sachindra Nath Sanyal, an Indian revolutionary and a founder of the Hindustan Republican Association
 Sanjeev Sanyal, Indian economist and author.
 Jaya Bachchan (originally Bhaduri), Indian film actress, politician and a member of Parliament
 Amar Nath Bhaduri, Indian molecular enzymologist and chemical biologist
 Abhijit Bhaduri, Indian author, columnist and management consultant
 Nrisingha Prasad Bhaduri, Indian historian, writer and Indologist
 Sisir Bhaduri,  Indian stage actor and theatre founder
 Shibdas Bhaduri,  Indian professional footballer
 Anirban Lahiri, Indian professional golfer
 Bappi Lahiri, an Indian singer, composer.
 Jhumpa Lahiri, American author
 Mahua Moitra, Indian politician and a Member of parliament
 Shantanu Moitra, Indian score composer, musician and pianist
 Rupankar Bagchi,  Bengali singer-songwriter and playback singer.
 Jatindramohan Bagchi,  Bengali poet and editor.
 Subroto Bagchi, Indian entrepreneur and business leader
 Tanishk Bagchi, Indian music producer, composer and singer.
 Biman Bagchi, Indian National Science Chair Professor

Modern usage
 Varendra Research Society
 Varendra Research Museum
 Varendra rebellion
 Varendra University
 Varendra tract

See also
 North Bengal
 Pundravardhana

References

Ancient divisions in Bengal